Burquitlam was a provincial electoral district for the Legislative Assembly of British Columbia, Canada from 2001 to 2009.

Demographics

Geography 
The area of the Burquitlam riding included parts of both Burnaby and Coquitlam in the eastern suburbs of Vancouver.  The riding straddled the border between the two cities.

History

Member of Legislative Assembly 
Its only MLA was Harry Bloy, a former president of a local telecommunications company. He was elected in 2001 and 2005, as a member of the British Columbia Liberal Party.

Election results 

|-

|-
 
|NDP
|Bart Healey
|align="right"|9,682
|align="right"|44.68%
|align="right"|
|align="right"|$47,079

|Independent
|Graham "Evil Genius" Fox
|align="right"|125
|align="right"|0.58%
|align="right"|
|align="right"|$121

|-

|-
 
|NDP
|Bart Healey
|align="right"|4,678
|align="right"|23.68%
|align="right"|
|align="right"|$26,422

External links 
BC Stats
Results of 2001 election (pdf)
2001 Expenditures (pdf)
Website of the Legislative Assembly of British Columbia

Former provincial electoral districts of British Columbia
Politics of Burnaby
Politics of Coquitlam